Michael Neville (26 February 1887 – 26 December 1981) was an Irish hurler who played for the Wexford senior team.

Neville made his first appearance for the team during the 1906 championship and was a regular member of the starting fifteen until his retirement after the 1920 championship. During that time he won one All-Ireland medal and two Leinster medals.

At club level Neville was a one-time county club championship medalist with Castlebridge.

References

1887 births
1981 deaths
All-Ireland Senior Hurling Championship winners
Castlebridge hurlers
Irish postmen
Wexford inter-county hurlers